"Titanic" is a song by Falco from his 1992 studio album Nachtflug. It was released as a lead single from the album.

Background and writing 
The song is written by Rob and Ferdi Bolland (music) and Falco (lyrics).

The recording was produced by Rob and Ferdi Bolland.

Commercial performance 
The song reached no. 3 in Austria and no. 47 in Germany.

Track listings 
7" single Electrola 86 2010 7 (1992, Germany)
 A. "Titanic" (Radio Version) (3:37)
 B. "Titanic" (Original Remix) (4:20)
 		 	 
CD maxi single Electrola 620 102 7 (1992)
 "Titanic" (Radio Version) (3:37)
 "Titanic" (Club Mix) (6:34)

12" Maxi Electrola 62010 6 5 (1992)	
 "Titanic" (Club Mix) (6:34)
 "Titanic" (Deep Tekno Tranz Mix) (6:52)
 "Titanic" (Original Remix) (4:20)
 "Titanic" (Deep Tekno Tranz Edit) (4:28)

Charts

References

External links 

 Falco – "Titanic" at Discogs

Songs about the RMS Titanic
1992 songs
1992 singles
Falco (musician) songs
Electrola singles
EMI Records singles
Songs written by Falco (musician)
Songs written by Rob Bolland
Songs written by Ferdi Bolland